Shankar Purushottam Agharkar (18 November 1884 – 1 September 1960) was an Indian  Morphologist. Agharkar obtained his PhD degree (1919) from the University of Berlin, Germany. His specialization was in Plant Morphology. He was the Ghosh Professor of Botany (1920–47) at the University of Calcutta; and Founder Director (1946–60) of Maharashtra Association for the Cultivation of Science. He is one of the leading botanists of India. He explored biodiversity of Western Ghats where he came across a species of freshwater jellyfish, which was until then only known to be found in Africa. These findings were published in scientific journal Nature in 1912. Dr. Annandale, the Superintendent of the Indian Museum in Kolkata, helped Dr. Agharkar in his further endeavours to collect, preserve and conduct microscopic examinations of animal and plant specimens. The institute ARI, Pune has been named after his name.

Early life 
He was born in 1884. Since childhood he was fascinated by plants and animals which led him to discover a new species of jellyfish. He was known for his accurate information and detailed observations.

Education 
Later C.V.Raman recommended him for the Ghosh professorship at Calcutta (now known as Kolkata). He went to Germany to obtain the PhD degree from the University of Berlin in 1919 but was imprisoned as the World War I broke out. However he completed his PhD in jail and returned to India.

Awards and honours
Maharashtra Association for the Cultivation of Science Research Institute, was renamed in 1992 as the Agharkar Research Institute (ARI) in honour the Founder Director.
Professor Albert Seward Memorial Lectureship by Birbal Sahni Institute of Palaeobotany – 1955
Member of Indian Botanical Society (President) - 1923
President, Botany Section of Indian Science Congress - 1924
Indian Science Congress Medal of Asiatic Society - 1934
Member of Indian Society of Soil Science (Honorary Secretary) - 1935-1940
President of Botanical Society of Bengal - 1940-1945
President of Indian Ecological Society - 1940-1945
Secretary of Asiatic Society - 1943-1945
Vice President of Asiatic Society - 1945-1946
President of Brihan Maharashtra Parishad- 1943

See also 
 Agharkar Research Institute

References 

1884 births
19th-century Indian botanists
1960 deaths
Humboldt University of Berlin alumni
Academic staff of the University of Calcutta
20th-century Indian botanists
People from Sindhudurg district
Marathi people
Scientists from Maharashtra
Expatriates from British India in Germany